The year 1771 in architecture involved some significant events.

Buildings and structures

Buildings

 Bath Assembly Rooms, designed by John Wood the Younger, completed in England.
 Claydon House, the second English country house completed on this site in Buckinghamshire.
 Harewood House in West Yorkshire, England, a country house designed by John Carr and Robert Adam, is completed.
 Pavillon de Louveciennes in Louveciennes, Yvelines, France, designed by Claude Nicolas Ledoux, is completed.
 Putuo Zongcheng Temple of Chengde, Hebei province, China is completed.
 Thatched House Lodge in the (modern-day) London Borough of Richmond upon Thames is remodelled as a royal residence by John Soane.
 Ornamental temple (a folly) on Temple Island in the River Thames near Henley in England, designed by James Wyatt, is built.
 Second phase of building the new Stockholm Palace is completed by Carl Fredrik Adelcrantz.
 Façade of church of San Rocco, Venice, designed by Bernardino Maccarucci, completed.

Births
 Joseph Gandy, English architectural artist and architect (died 1843)

Deaths
 February 21 – Filippo Raguzzini, Italian architect (born 1690)
 April 29 – Francesco Bartolomeo Rastrelli, French-born Italian architect working in Saint Petersburg (born 1700)
 William Baker of Audlem, English architect (born 1705)
 Edmund Woolley, English-born American architect and master carpenter (born c.1695)

References

1771 works
Years in architecture
18th-century architecture